Reece Noi (born 13 June 1988) is a British-Ghanaian actor. He is best known for portraying Taylor Mitchell in the BBC school-based drama serial, Grange Hill, from 2004 to 2007, and also Noel Parkin and Earl Kelly in the second and fourth series of Waterloo Road in 2007 and 2009 respectively, and Mossador in the HBO series Game of Thrones. Noi also starred in the 2019 Emmy Nominated Netflix crime series When They See Us.

Career 
Noi started his career in Liverpool gangster film My Kingdom,  a modern day re-telling of Shakespeare's King Lear playing The Fool opposite Richard Harris's Lear. He worked consistently on TV until he landed his role in Grange Hill which led to Noi being very much in demand and he went on to secure roles in the BBC dramas Conviction and Doctors, where he played terminally-ill teenager Sam. Next came a recurring role in Emmerdale as Ryan Hayworth during 2007 and 2008. In 2007, Noi joined BBC school drama Waterloo Road, playing a character named Noel Parkin in the 8th episode of Series 2, and later returned in 2009 to play bad boy Earl Kelly, who in the eighth episode of the series fatally shot his girlfriend Maxine Barlow (played by Ellie Paskell).

Noi made an appearance in the Channel 4 series Shameless, series 4 episode 5, as Debbie's Christian boyfriend, Luke Newman. He also had guest roles of Carl in BBC series   Paradox and Tyler Simmons in ITV series The Bill in 2009.

Noi starred alongside Sophie Okonedo and Dougray Scott in ITV four-part drama Father And Son, playing Sean O'Connor on ITV1 in the spring of 2010. In 2011, he appeared in BBC law drama Silk. He then went on to play Levi in Sky Atlantic's Hit & Miss.

In 2012, Noi appeared in ITV2 supernatural comedy Switch alongside former EastEnders star Lacey Turner. He featured on a number of popular UK roles before then appearing in Game of Thrones from 2014–2015 as an emancipated slave, called Mossador. In a 2019 interview with Australian publication IF Magazine Noi stated that executive producers David Benoiff and D.B Weiss liked his work on Season 4 so much they then wrote Mossador for him. 

Noi appeared in FOX networks mini serial Houdini and Doyle. In 2019 he took on the role of Matias Reyes in Ava DuVernay's  Netflix mini series "When They See Us" based on the true story of the "Central Park Five" The show has since been nominated for sixteen Emmy Awards.

Filmography

TV

Video games

Theatre
A Streetcar Named Desire Young Collector at The Royal Exchange Theatre, Manchester
 Moonfleece (2010) Link

Radio Drama
Zola-Sex (2016) Paul 
Porcelain (2014)
Divided We Fall (2010) Carl
Craven (2009) Michael Chambers
Stone (2009) Tyler Hyman
Takeaway (2007) Des

References

External links
 
 http://www.curtisbrown.co.uk/reece-noi
 http://www.thestage.co.uk/reviews/review.php/27438/moonfleece
 http://www.theartsdesk.com/index.php?option=com_k2&view=item&id=1113:moonfleece-theatre-review&Itemid=27
 http://www.whatsonstage.com/reviews/theatre/off-west+end/E8831267808392/Moonfleece.html

English male television actors
1988 births
Living people
English male child actors
Male actors from Manchester
Black British male actors
21st-century English male actors
20th-century English male actors